was a Japanese actor.

Inoue was born from Miyazaki Prefecture. He was represented with K Factory.

Biography
Inoue participated as a founding member of Gekidan Kakusoko presided over by Ikuji Nakamura from 1987, in which he was active mainly on stage. After the dissolution of the theatre unit in 2002 he was active in television dramas and theatre, in which he appeared in popular series such as Wataru Seken wa Oni Bakari (Tokyo Broadcasting System), Doctor-X: Surgeon Michiko Daimon and Aibō (both TV Asahi), and played an active role as a name apprentice who skillfully plays diverse characters ranging from hot middle-aged men to cold villains.

Inoue's special skill was on the drum kit, in the Wataoni Oyaji Band in the form of Takuzo Kadono in Wataru Seken wa Oni Bakari, he was in charge of percussion and also performed his CD debut.

He found out he had cancer in December 2015, and he continued his work while repeating hospital admissions, and later became hospitalized after losing his physical condition in late February 2017. Inoue died of lower laryngeal cancer at a hospital in Tokyo at 18:30 on 4 March of the same year. The stage play Yukimaroge in 2016 became his final appearance.

Filmography

Stage

TV dramas
 NHK

 Nippon TV

 Tokyo Broadcasting System

 Fuji Television

 TV Asahi

 TV Tokyo

Anime television

Films

Dubbing

References

External links
 – K Factory 

People from Miyazaki Prefecture
1960 births
2017 deaths
20th-century Japanese male actors
21st-century Japanese male actors
Japanese male stage actors
Japanese male television actors